Christian Frémont (23 April 1942 – 3 August 2014) was the chief of staff for Nicolas Sarkozy. He was also the Representative of the French Co-Prince of Andorra from September 2008 to May 2012. He died of cancer in August 2014.

References

1942 births
2014 deaths
École nationale d'administration alumni
Union for a Popular Movement politicians
Government of Andorra
Nicolas Sarkozy
People from Dordogne
Deaths from cancer in France